Buccaneer is a television series, made by the BBC from 1979 to 1980. Created by experienced television writer N. J. (Norman) Crisp, it was broadcast over 13 weeks from April to July 1980.

Buccaneer, dealing with a developing air freight business, starred Bryan Marshall, Mark Jones, Pamela Salem and Clifford Rose, and was produced by Gerard Glaister. John Brason, who had previously worked with Glaister on Secret Army, served as script editor.

The aircraft that 'starred' in the series was a Bristol Britannia of Redcoat Air Cargo, registration G-BRAC, which wore the markings of 'Redair', the name of the fictional airline in the series.

The first episode of Buccaneer concerned getting out of the fictional country of Ximbali; this just presaged real-life events when people fled from the former Rhodesia which had been renamed to the similar-sounding Zimbabwe. Amusingly, in view of later political developments, the lead character in Buccaneer, played by Bryan Marshall was named 'Tony Blair'. Buccaneer was also the first BBC drama series to be broadcast with Ceefax subtitles for the hearing impaired.

One reason for there being only one series (13 episodes) of Buccaneer was the fact that the Bristol Britannia G-BRAC was destroyed in a crash near Boston, Massachusetts, on 16 February 1980, shortly after the completion of filming, but just before transmission of the series. Of the eight people on board, seven were killed, and only one survived, albeit seriously injured.

With the 'starring aircraft' destroyed in a crash, plans for a second series were abandoned. Buccaneer has not been released on video or DVD. It became overshadowed by ITV's better-remembered World War II drama Airline, starring Roy Marsden, which was first broadcast in 1982.

Regular cast 
 Bryan Marshall - Tony Blair
 Clifford Rose - Charles Burton
 Pamela Salem - Monica Burton
 Mark Jones - Ray Mason
 Carolyn Courage - Kim Hayward
 Shirley Anne Field - Janet Blair

Episodes

Notes

External links

BBC television dramas
1980 British television series debuts
1980 British television series endings
1980s British drama television series
Aviation television series
English-language television shows